A Hollywood marriage originally meant a glamorous high society marriage between celebrities involved in the U.S. film industry, as "Hollywood" is a common metonymous term for that industry; such marriages are more commonly known as supercouples in modern parlance. However, the term has grown to also have strong negative connotations of a marriage that is of short duration and quickly ends in separation or divorce. The term developed the negative connotations fairly early; by the 1930s, a "Hollywood marriage" was a marriage both glamorous and short-lived.

Issues 

Sympathetic views of celebrities point out that in Hollywood, it is mostly the bad marriages that are documented by the media, giving a skewed perspective that might make "Hollywood marriages" appear to have a worse success rate than they have in reality. In 1972 Bob Thomas of the Associated Press remarked specifically about the tendency to ignore lasting celebrity marriages with the examples he gave including Bob Hope's marriage to Dolores Hope and Rosalind Russell's marriage to producer Frederick Brisson.

Negative views of Hollywood marriages take the position that the divorce rates are indeed unusually high among celebrities and that this is caused by faults within Hollywood as a culture or by personal faults of the celebrities themselves. They point to the usage of weddings as publicity stunts, the egotism or immaturity of celebrities or "celebrity culture", and high rates of infidelity or promiscuity. Bee Wilson, in an article for The Daily Telegraph, critiqued "Hollywood marriages" for often being based on the unrealistic dreams of what she termed "permanent children", although she points to some classic Hollywood couples—like Lauren Bacall and Humphrey Bogart, or Paul Newman and Joanne Woodward—as exceptions to these criticisms. While the introduction to the Cultural Sociology of Divorce: An Encyclopedia edited by Robert E. Emery specifically mentions Hollywood divorces as epitomizing a "consumerist, throw-away-marriage view found in the West."

The actors and entertainers themselves vary in perspective on the commonality or reason for divorce in Hollywood. In 1961 Anne Baxter stated Hollywood was "the most difficult place in America for marriage" due, in part, to the "terrible extremes of success and failure" both spouses may face. In a 1964 interview Mitzi Gaynor, who would remain married to the husband mentioned in the interview until his death (in 2006), took the more "defensive" position that "Hollywood" couples look different mostly because "everything we do is magnified." However, she conceded they might be slightly different because "you have to be a little off-center to get into this business in the first place."

Beyond anecdote or opinion, the actual evidence on the matter is complicated by differing definitions of who qualifies as a "celebrity" or "Hollywood." A study from Radford University placed "dancers and choreographers" as the occupations having the highest percent currently divorced with "Entertainers and performers, sports and related workers, all other" still being above average at tenth. That placed them between "Nursing, psychiatric, and home health aides" at ninth and "Baggage porters and concierges" at eleventh. In 1900, even before the modern film industry had coalesced, in an era where concert saloons and minstrel shows were the predominant form of entertainment, "actors, professional showmen" were listed as having the highest divorce rate of occupations. A Forbes article placed "professional athletes and entertainers" together and with a high divorce rate.

Entertainers married a year or less 

The idea that the term "Hollywood marriage" equates to something short-term is sometimes displayed by citing celebrities who had marriages that ended in divorce, separation, or annulment within approximately one year. The following examples of that are primarily restricted to marriages involving a notable actor, entertainer or director linked to "Hollywood" in some way and which ended in divorce or annulment. Note that the vast majority of the examples are from the 1970s onward; this is in part because no-fault divorce became legalized in that era, which increased the ease and number of divorces overall. (In much of the early 20th century, there was a one-year waiting period to finalize a divorce in California, which was later repealed.)

Entertainers married 50 years or more 
Entertainment couples whose relationships last for decades, and/or life, are occasionally used as a counterpoint when referring to "Hollywood marriage". Listed are a selection of entertainers who have or had marriages that lasted over 50 years.

(Note that in a few of these cases, the entertainers were not necessarily in faithful marriages. Tom Jones, for example, had many extramarital affairs throughout his marriage.)

Legend:

References

Bibliography

 
 
 
 
 

Celebrity
Temporary marriages